"Theme from Mahogany (Do You Know Where You're Going To)" is a song written by Michael Masser and Gerry Goffin and produced by Masser. It was initially recorded by American singer Thelma Houston in 1973, and then by Diana Ross as the theme to the 1975 Motown/Paramount film Mahogany that also starring Ross. The song was released on September 24, 1975 by Motown Records as the lead single for both the film's soundtrack and Ross' seventh studio album, Diana Ross.

Production notes
Produced by Masser, the song is a ballad that portrays its protagonist (Ross) as a black woman who becomes a successful Rome fashion designer.

Recorded with a full orchestral accompaniment, "Theme from Mahogany" became one of the most recognizable elements of the film, receiving praise from many critics.

Later released as a single, "Theme from Mahogany" became a number-one hit on both the U.S. Billboard Hot 100, and the Easy Listening charts.

The song was nominated for the Academy Award for Best Song. Ross performed the song live at the Academy Awards ceremony via satellite from Amsterdam, the Netherlands.

Record World said that "Diana handles [the song] with consummate ease" and that "her frail but stunningly effective voice is captured amidst a soulful tapestry of sound."

Personnel
Diana Ross – vocals
Leland Sklar – electric bass
Hal Blaine – drums
Lee Holdridge – arranger

Release and track listing

Chart performance

Weekly charts

Year-end charts

Other versions

 Singer Thelma Houston was the first artist to record the song in 1973. 
 French singer Nicole Rieu released a French-language version the song (titled "En courant") as a single in 1976.
 Dinah Shore recorded the song for her album Dinah! in 1976.
 Johnny Mathis included the song on his album I Only Have Eyes for You in 1976.
 Shirley Bassey included the song on her album Sings the Movies in 1995.
 2 Brothers on the 4th Floor released a rap version of the song in 1998
 Mariah Carey included the song on her 1998 compilation album, #1's, as an international bonus track.
 Jennifer Lopez included the song on her 1999 album On the 6, as an international bonus track.
 Tina Arena covered the song for her 2007 album Songs of Love & Loss, which also included a version of Ross' "Love Hangover"
 Filipina singer Juris did a cover of this song from the 2013 album,  Dreaming Of You.
 Pianist Richard Clayderman included the song on his album Essential Love Songs in 2015.

See also 
 List of number-one adult contemporary singles of 1975 (U.S.)
 List of Billboard Hot 100 number-one singles of 1976

References

External links
 List of cover versions of "Theme from Mahogany (Do You Know Where You're Going To)" at SecondHandSongs.com
 

1973 songs
1975 singles
1976 singles
Billboard Hot 100 number-one singles
Cashbox number-one singles
Diana Ross songs
Thelma Houston songs
Mariah Carey songs
Pop ballads
Songs written for films
Songs with lyrics by Gerry Goffin
Songs written by Michael Masser
1975 songs
Motown singles
Soul ballads
Rhythm and blues ballads
1970s ballads